This is an incomplete list of notable online image archives, including both image hosting websites like Flickr and archives hosted by libraries and other academic or historical institutions.

List of archives

See also

Commons:Free media resources
Wikipedia:List of online newspaper archives
List of online magazines
Wikipedia:List of online video archives
Newsreel

References

 
online image archives